The list of awards and nominations received by Jessica Lange chronicles her achievements in the film industry.

In total, Lange has received six Academy Award nominations, winning two Oscars, sixteen Golden Globe nominations, winning five, ten Emmy nominations, winning three, one Tony Award nomination and win, five Screen Actors Guild Award nominations, winning one, five Satellite Award nominations, winning one, one British Academy Film Award nomination, and one Laurence Olivier Award nomination, among others. Additionally, she is the second actress in Academy Award history to win Best Actress after winning Best Supporting Actress, the third actress and first performer since 1943 to receive two acting nominations in the same year, the fifth actress and ninth performer to win Oscars in both the lead and supporting acting categories, and is tied as the sixth-most Oscar-nominated actress in history. Lange holds the record for the most Golden Globe nominations in the Best Actress in a Miniseries or Motion Picture Made for Television category. She is the only performer ever to win Primetime Emmy Awards in both the Outstanding Supporting Actress and Outstanding Lead Actress categories for the same miniseries. Lange has also garnered one Critics Choice Award and three Dorian Awards, making her the most honored actress by the Gay and Lesbian Entertainment Critics Association. Her work has also earned her the National Society of Film Critics award, the New York Film Critics Circle award, the Los Angeles Film Critics Association award, the Boston Society of Film Critics award, the Kansas City Film Critics Circle award, the Utah Film Critics Association award, the Moscow International Film Festival award, the Taormina Film Festival award, the Donostia Award from the San Sebastián International Film Festival and the Critics' Choice Award, apart from other critics' circle and festival awards. Lange has also been awarded a prestigious "Gala Tribute" from the Film Society of Lincoln Center, a Theater World Award, and a Crystal Award, as well as other specialized awards and tributes. In 2014, the Hollywood Chamber of Commerce revealed that Lange was scheduled to receive her own five-pointed Motion Picture Star at the Hollywood Walk of Fame.

Film and television performances awards

Academy Awards 
The Academy Awards, most commonly referred to as the Oscars, is an annual ceremony established by the American Academy of Motion Picture Arts and Sciences (AMPAS) in 1927 to recognize excellence of professionals in the film industry, including directors, actors, and writers. Out of six received nominations Lange won twice (in 1982 and 1994), once being nominated in both acting categories within the same year (in 1982).

Bambi Awards 
The Bambi Awards, named after Felix Salten's book Bambi, A Life in the Woods, are presented annually by Hubert Burda Media in Germany. To recognise excellence in international media and television, both domestic and foreign, its first ceremony was held in 1948, as the oldest media awards in the country. Lange won in 1983.

Boston Society of Film Critics Awards 
The Boston Society of Film Critics (BSFC) is an organization of film reviewers from Boston, Massachusetts, based publications, which was formed in 1981 to honor commendations to the best of the films, filmmakers, local film theaters and film societies for outstanding film programming. Lange won in 1983.

British Academy of Film and Television Arts Awards (BAFTA Awards) 
The BAFTA Awards are presented in an annual award show hosted by the British Academy of Film and Television Arts (BAFTA), as the British equivalent of the Oscars. The ceremony used to take place in April or May, but from 2002 onwards it takes place in February in order to precede the U.S. Academy Awards. Lange was nominated once (in 1984).

Chicago Film Critics Association Awards 
The Chicago Film Critics Association (CFCA) is an American film critic association that maintains professional, charitable and educational goals, including Chicago Film Critics Awards which are held annually, in order to honor outstanding film works, performances and individuals. Lange was nominated once (in 1994).

Critics' Choice Awards 
The Critics' Choice Awards are presented by Broadcast Film Critics Association (BFCA) for movies, and Broadcast Television Journalists Association (BTJA), respectively, for TV to recognize the finest achievements on networks and channels. While the film awards have been given since 1995, their TV offshoots were established in 2011. Lange has been nominated five times (in 2012, 2013, 2014, 2015, and 2018) winning once.

Dorian Awards 
The Dorian Awards are given by the Gay and Lesbian Entertainment Critics Association (GALECA), launched in 2009. Rather than focusing on gay content, the awards are intended to reflect gay interest, being named after Oscar Wilde. Lange was nominated five times, winning at three occasions.

Golden Globe Awards 
The Golden Globe Award is an accolade presented by the members of the Hollywood Foreign Press Association (HFPA) to recognize excellence in film and television, both domestic and foreign. The formal ceremonies are presented annually as a major part of the film industry's awards season, culminating each year with the Oscars. Lange has won five awards (in 1976, 1982, 1994, 1995 and 2011), from a total of sixteen accumulated nominations.

Golden Nymphs 
The Golden Nymphs are the statuettes awarded to the winners of the official competition at the Festival de Télévision de Monte-Carlo held in Monaco, under patronage of Prince Albert II of Monaco. Lange has been nominated once.

Gracie Awards 
The Gracie Awards, named after the American comedian Gracie Allen, are presented by the Alliance for Women in Media (AWM) to honor female individuals who have made exemplary contributions in electronic media and affiliates. Lange won in 2004.

IGN Summer Movie Awards

Joseph Plateau Awards 
Until 2006, Joseph Plateau Awards were held in Belgium in honor of Joseph Plateau, Belgian physicist who discovered the principle of the persistence of vision and invented the phenakistiscope. Considered to have been the most prestigious awards in the country, the awards were an equivalent to the Oscars in the United States of America, the David di Donatello Awards in Italy, the César Awards in France and/or the British BAFTA Awards, and the ceremony was held in conjunction with the Flanders International Film Festival Ghent, which initially co-founded the event. Lange won the first editions of the ceremony.

Kansas City Film Critics Circle Awards 
The Kansas City Film Critics Circle (KCFCC) is a group of media film critics in the Kansas City region, founded in 1967 as reportedly the second oldest professional film critics association in the United States" (behind the New York Film Critics Circle). Recently, the annual film awards are called The Loutzenhiser Awards (after Dr. James Loutzenhiser, its founder). Lange won once.

Los Angeles Film Critics Association Awards 
The Los Angeles Film Critics Association (LAFCA) is a professional organization of Los Angeles-based professional film critics representing the print and electronic media in the region. Since 1975, the LAFCA awards are given in mid January. Lange won in 1994.

Moscow International Film Festival Awards 
Moscow International Film Festival (MIFF) is a film festival, originally held since 1935 in Moscow, Russia, while alternating with the Karlovy Vary festival every second year. The event is presided by the head of the Russian Union of Cinematographers, and a Soviet/Russian filmmaker, Nikita Mikhalkov. Lange won in 1983.

National Board of Review Awards

National Society of Film Critics Awards 
National Society of Film Critics (NSFC) is a representative of the International Federation of Film Critics (FIPRESCI), which comprises the national organizations of professional film critics and film journalists from around the world. Established in 1966, by a group of New York City-based film critics who had been denied membership into the New York Film Critics Circle, the association was founded in order to counteract the influence of New York Times critic, Bosley Crowther, reportedly. Lange has been nominated five times, winning once (in 1982).

New York Film Critics Circle Awards 
The New York Film Critics Circle (NYFCC) annually honors excellence in cinema worldwide by an organization of film reviewers from New York City publications since 1935. The ceremony is held on December of each year, in part as a response to the Academy Awards. Lange has been nominated twice in the same year, winning one category.

Pan–American Association of Film & Television Journalists

People's Choice Awards

Primetime Emmy Awards 
The Emmy Awards, considered as a TV equivalent to the Academy Awards for film in US, are presented by the Academy of Television Arts & Sciences (ATAS), the National Academy of Television Arts & Sciences (NATAS) and the International Academy of Television Arts & Sciences in various sectors of the television industry including entertainment programming, news and documentary shows. Currently three annual ceremonies are held; for Primetime Emmy (since 1949), Daytime Emmy (since 1974) and International Emmy awards (since 1973). Lange won three awards, in 2009 2012, and 2014 from a total of ten nominations.

PRISM Awards 
The Entertainment Industries Council (EIC), a non-profit organization founded in 1983, annually presents, in collaboration with the Substance Abuse and Mental Health Services Administration (SAMHSA), FX Network, and News Corporation, the PRISM Awards. The event is held in Hollywood, and has also categories to recognize actors for their outstanding performances of substance abuse, addiction and mental illness onscreen, in television and feature films. Lange was nominated twice (in 2009 and 2010).

Sant Jordi Awards 
The Sant Jordi Awards are among the most prestigious awards in Catalan cinema. The event that takes place in Barcelona, Spain, was created in 1957 to encourage the Catalan film at a time when the Francisco Franco's régime banned Catalan language movies in Spain. Lange won in 1996.

Satellite Awards 
The Satellite Awards (initially known as Golden Satellite Awards) that honors the most outstanding achievements in the fields of cinema, television and new media is given by the International Press Academy (IPA), which is a diverse association of professional entertainment journalists, representing both domestic and foreign markets in print, television, radio, cable and new media outlets. Lange was nominated five times, winning once (in 2011).

Saturn Awards 
The Academy of Science Fiction, Fantasy, & Horror Films (ASFFF) presents each year the Saturn Awards, which honor the top works in science fiction, fantasy, and horror in film, television, and home video since 1972. Lange was nominated four times, in 2011, 2012, 2013, and 2014.

Screen Actors Guild Awards 
The Screen Actors Guild Awards, the only national network television show to acknowledge the work of union members and one of the major awards events in Hollywood since 1995, is an accolade given by the Screen Actors Guild (SAG) to recognize outstanding performances by its members. Lange has been nominated five times, with one win (2011).

Silver Frames 
Fotogramas de Plata (Silver Frames) are annually presented by the Spanish oldest film magazine Fotogramas, issued monthly, to award domestic as well as foreign films. (Subsequently, Fotogramas en Corto, in Short Frames, reward short films). In contrast to the awards for best film which are voted usually by critics, these awards in acting categories are voted by the magazine's readers. Its categories have varied over sixty editions (since 1951), as well as the selection mode and the number of candidates. Lange was nominated once (in 1982).

Silver Ribbons 
The Silver Ribbons are given by the association of Italian film critics, Italian National Syndicate of Film Journalists as one of the oldest movie awards in Europe. Lange has been nominated once.

Television Critics Association Awards 
The TCA Awards are presented by the Television Critics Association (TCA), a group of approximately 200 United States and Canadian journalists and columnists who cover television programming. The awards are bestowed in recognition of excellence in television, since 1985. Overall, eleven categories are presented every summer. Lange has been nominated twice.

Utah Film Critics Association Awards 
The Utah Film Critics Association (UFCA) awards are presented by the Utah-based cinema journalists, affiliated with publications, broadcasting stations and online media in the country. Lange has won once.

Verona Film Festival Awards 
Schermi d'Amore (Festival of Romantic Films and Melodrama) is an international film festival established in 1995, which focuses on the romantic film genre. From 2002, the event that takes place in Verona, Italy evolved into today's Verona Film Festival – Schermi d'Amore. Lange has entered the 3rd edition of the fest (in 1999).

Stage performances awards

Anton Chekhov Fine Arts Awards 
While attending the Drama School at the prestigious Guthrie Theater in Minneapolis, Minnesota, Lange has received the Anton Chekhov Fine Arts Award.

Drama Desk Awards 
The Drama Desk Awards are presented annually by The Drama Desk Organization to recognize excellence in New York theatre productions on Broadway, Off-Broadway and Off-Off-Broadway.

Laurence Olivier Awards 
The Laurence Olivier Award is presented annually by the Society of London Theatre (SLT) to recognize excellence in professional theater. Named after the renowned British actor Laurence Olivier, the awards are a UK equivalent of Broadway's Tony Awards. Lange was nominated for her performance in the Eugene O'Neill's play at Lyric Theatre, London (in 2001).

Outer Critics Circle Awards 
The Outer Critics Circle Awards are presented annually for theatrical achievements both on Broadway and Off-Broadway.

Tony Awards 
The Antoinette Perry Award for Excellence in Theatre, more commonly known informally as the Tony Award, recognizes achievement in live Broadway theatre. The awards are presented by the American Theatre Wing and The Broadway League at an annual ceremony in New York City.

Other honors

Crystal Award 
The Crystal Awards were established by Women in Film Los Angeles (WIF) in 1977 to honor outstanding women who, through their endurance and the excellence of their work, have helped to expand the role of women within the entertainment industry. Lange was awarded in 2000.

Donostia Award 
The San Sebastián International Film Festival (SS IFF) is a Spanish film fest, which was originally established to award Spanish language films in 1953 in San Sebastián (officially Donostia-San Sebastián). In 1986 the member of International Federation of Film Producers Associations (FIAPF) created the Donostia Awards, granted to a great film personality in recognition for their work and career. Lange was honored (along with Bob Hoskins and Dennis Hopper) for lifetime contribution in 2002.

Film Society of Lincoln Center Award 
The Film Society of Lincoln Center (FSLC) is a film presentation organization founded in 1969 that, as one of the twelve resident organizations at the Lincoln Center for the Performing Arts, runs annual Gala Tribute awards to honor legendary stars and industry leaders at the Lincoln Center's Avery Fisher Hall. Lange won in 2006.

George Eastman House Honors Award 
The George Eastman House Honors Award is a newly established award by George Eastman House (GEH), which is the oldest museum of photography and film, opened to the public in 1949 in Rochester, New York, US. The award is given for lifetime contribution and for traditions and values championed by the museum. Shortly after publishing 50 Photographs, her own book of black-and-white photos, Lange became the first recipient of the award in 2009.

Glamour Awards 
The Glamour Awards is hosted by Glamour magazine every year to hand out different awards to honor extraordinary and inspirational women from a variety of fields, including entertainment, business, sports, music, science, medicine, education, and politics.

Hollywood Walk of Fame Award 
The Hollywood Walk of Fame as one of the most successful marketing ideas ever produced, it is administered by the Hollywood chamber of commerce. The stars located on both sides of Hollywood Boulevard and Vine Street in the district of Los Angeles, California, are permanent public monuments to various artists for their achievement in the entertainment industry, as well as to fictional characters. On June 20, the Selection Committee announced that Lange will receive a star with the symbol of classic film camera representing her motion pictures by 2014.

Inspire Award 
Inspire Awards Honorees (originally called the Impact Award) was established in 2004 by AARP The Magazine a bi-monthly periodical (originally known as Modern Maturity) that focuses on aging issues. The award salutes outstanding individuals who are using their energy, creativity, and passion to make the world a better place.

Jason Robards Award

Kirk Douglas Award

Krzysztof Kieślowski Award 
Krzysztof Kieślowski Award is a lifetime achievement award given on the Camerimage Film Festival in Bydgoszcz, Poland.

L'Oreal Awards

Lucie Award 
The Lucie Awards, is the annual event honoring the greatest achievements in photography. The photography community from countries around the globe will pay tribute to the most outstanding photography achievements presented at the Gala Awards ceremony. Each year, the Advisory Board nominates deserving individuals across a variety of categories who will be honored during the Lucie Awards ceremony. Once the nominations have been received, the votes are tallied and an honoree in each category is identified. The honorees are pre-announced months before the Lucie Awards. The Lucie Awards are a signature program of Lucie Foundation.

Muse Award 
New York Women in Film & Television supports women calling the shots in film, television and digital media. NYWIFT energizes the careers of women in entertainment by illuminating their achievements, providing training and professional development, and advocating for equity.

NewNowNext Award 
The NewNowNext Awards is an American annual entertainment awards show, presented by the lesbian, gay, bisexual and transgender-themed channel Logo. Launched in 2008, awards are presented both for LGBT-specific and general interest achievements in entertainment and pop culture.

Premiere Award 
Premiere was an American and New York City-based film magazine published by Hachette Filipacchi Media U.S., between the years 1987 and 2007. Each year, the magazine's October issue celebrated some of the most prominent women in Hollywood. Actresses were typically the focus, although the magazine has also covered female studio executives and others in non-acting industry professions. A corresponding reception was held in Los Angeles. Lange was honored with the Women in Hollywood Icon Award in 2003, along with Renée Zellweger and Elizabeth Gabler.

Taormina Arte Award 
Taormina Film Fest (TFF) is a historic film festival is held in Italy since 1955, originally under the name Rassegna Cinematografica Internazionale di Messina e Taormina. The festival's most important career recognition called Taormina Arte Awards are annually presented to the most important and influential stars and filmmakers of world cinema. Lange won the award in 2009.

Theater World Award 
The Theater World Award (TWA) is the oldest award given in recognition of an outstanding New York City stage debut performance theater either on Broadway, or Off-Broadway, which was first awarded in 1946. It is not a competition, and is only given once to encourage and inspire newcomers to the stage to continue to pursue their dream. Lange won in 1992.

Western Heritage Award 
The Western Heritage Awards is an award bestowed by National Cowboy & Western Heritage Museum located in Oklahoma City, Oklahoma that owns more than 28,000 Western and American Indian art works and artifacts. The original bronze sculpture is awarded annually to principal creators of the winning entries in specified categories of Western literature, music, film and television. Lange won in 1993.

Women of Achievement Award

Anti-awards

Golden Raspberries 
The Golden Raspberry Awards, abbreviated as the Razzies, is an anti-award presented in recognition of the worst in movies, on the contrary. The term raspberry in the name is used in its irreverent sense, as in "blowing a raspberry". The annual show, founded in 1981 by publicist John J.B. Wilson, precedes the corresponding Academy Awards ceremony by one day. Lange was nominated in 1998.

Stinkers Bad Movie Awards

Los YoGa Awards

Footnotes

See also 
 Jessica Lange bibliography
 Jessica Lange discography
 Jessica Lange filmography
 List of stars on the Hollywood Walk of Fame

References 
General
 
 
 
 "Jessica Lange – Milestones". TCM Movie Database. TBS. tcm.com. Retrieved June 26, 2014.

Specific

External links 
 
 
 
 
 

Awards and nominations
Lists of awards received by American actor